The 2006 AFC Cup was the third edition of the AFC Cup. Al-Faisaly from Jordan became the first side to win the competition two years in a row.

Qualification

The 'developing' 11 nations in the Asian Football Confederation were invited to nominate one or two clubs to participate in the 2007 competition.  2005 winners, Al-Faisaly qualify to the group stage.

Bahrain are relegated AFC Cup.

Group stage

Matchday dates are: 7 and 21 March, 11 and 25 April, 5 and 16 May 2006
Group winners and 2 best runners-up qualify for quarter-finals

Group A

Matches:

Group B

Matches:

Group C

Matches:

Group D

Matches:

Group E

Matches:

Group F

Matches:

Best runners-up
Team in group of 4, result to bottom of the group uncounted.

Knockout stage

Bracket

Quarter-finals

|}

First leg

Second leg

Semifinals

|}

First leg

Second leg

Finals

|}

First leg

Second leg

References

2
AFC Cup seasons